The Bavarian Library Network (abbreviated BVB) is a library association of more than 150 academic libraries in Bavaria, Germany. It operates a union catalog, the Bavarian Union Catalog.

Based in Munich, it is one of the main library consortia in Germany, which lacks a singular, centralized institution.

References

Bibliography

External links 

 

Library associations
Bavarian State Library
Organisations based in Munich
Organizations established in the 1970s